David Pusey (born 28 January 1979 in Sydney, New South Wales) is a retired Australian rugby union footballer who played for the Brumbies and Western Force in the Super 14 competition and for Munster Rugby. He was educated at Newington College (1987–1996), is an Australian Schools and Under 21 international and is now a commercial helicopter pilot.

References 

1979 births
Living people
People educated at Newington College
Australian rugby union players
Rugby union flankers
ACT Brumbies players
Munster Rugby players
Western Force players
Rugby union players from Sydney